The beliefs and practices of Twelver Shia Islam are categorised into:

Theology or Roots of the Religion - five beliefs
Ancillaries of the Faith or Branches of the Religion - ten practices

Theological principles

Tawhid - the Oneness of God
Adl "divine justice"
Nubuwwah "prophethood"
Imamate "leadership of Mankind"
Mi'ad "Resurrection" of the dead

The Ancillaries of the Faith

Salat "ritual prayer"
Sawm "Fasting" during the month of Ramadan
Hajj "pilgrimage" to Mecca
Zakāt - charitable giving
Khums - a "Fifth" of specific kinds of income given to charity
Jihad "struggle"
Commanding right and forbidding wrong
Forbidding what is evil
Tawalla - love of faith and the chosen of God
Tabarra - disassociation from enemies of the faith and God's chosen.

See also 

 Principles of Shia Islam jurisprudence

Beliefs